Grabel is a surname. Notable people with the surname include:

 Ross Grabel (born 1950), American bridge player
 Susan Grabel, American feminist artist

References